Orveh-ye Sofla (also Romanized as ‘Orveh-ye Soflá) is a village in Olya Tayeb Rural District, in the Central District of Landeh County, Kohgiluyeh and Boyer-Ahmad Province, Iran. At the 2006 census, its population was 54, in 13 families.

References 

Populated places in Landeh County